Pelorovis ("prodigious/monstrous sheep") is an extinct genus of African wild cattle which existed during the Pleistocene epoch. The best known species is Pelorovis oldowayensis from Olduvai Gorge in Tanzania, from the Early Pleistocene. The species "Pelorovis" antiquus from the Late Pleistocene-Holocene has since been moved into Syncerus, the same genus as living African buffalo.

Taxonomy
The genus was first described by Hans Reck in 1928 to house his new species P. oldowayensis, which he described from bones originally found by him in Olduvai Gorge in northern German East Africa (Tanzania) in 1913, the first ever time this famous locality was explored by a palaeontologist. The holotype is a fossil skull and assorted bones kept in Berlin.

The species P. kaisensis was named in 1994 from Kaiso, Uganda. Hadjouis and Sahnouni considered it to be closer to Syncerus in 2005.

Systematics
A 2007 study by Bienvenido Martínez-Navarro and colleagues of the morphology of the fossil remains came to the conclusion that Pelorovis is probably not monophyletic. These authors reclassify the early forms of the genus, P. turkanensis and P. oldowayensis, in the genus Bos. In contrast, they find that the late Pleistocene form Pelorovis antiquus seems to be a close relative of the modern African buffalo (Syncerus caffer). This approach essentially subsumes the genus as a synonym of Bos, because the type species is P. oldowayensis. A number of the authors of this study reiterated their classification of the taxa Pelorovis turkanensis and P. oldowayensis in the genus Bos in another paper published 2014. Alexandre Hassanin follows the interpretations of Martínez-Navarro et al., pointing to previous genetics work which show that the bovid lineages which produced the modern species within the genera Bos, Bubalus and Syncerus split from each other some eight to nine million years ago, indicating that either the fossil ancestors of these species have not yet been discovered, or that they already have been found, but are taxonomically misidentified. He further points out that Martínez-Navarro et al. are only looking for the ancestor of Bos primigenius in their studies of African fossil bovids, and that the Asian species of Bos may have been derived from other fossil species. Lastly, Hassanin notes that if Pelorovis is reduced into synonymy due to these studies, this also implies the other Pleistocene fossil genera Leptobos and Epileptobos are synonymous with Bos. 

A 2018 study by Tong et al. of the Chinese fossil representation of Bos primigenius uses morphology to dispute these conclusions regarding these taxa belonging to the genus Bos, as well as if they are the ancestral line from which Bos evolved, instead hewing to the traditional interpretation that the Indian Early Pleistocene fossil species Bos acutifrons is the primordial ancestor of Bos. 

Syncerus antiquus was described by Georges Louis Duvernoy in 1851 from a skull discovered along the Bou Sellam River near the city of Sétif, Algeria. It was found at one meter in depth, when excavating the foundations of a new mill, and subsequently sent to Paris. Duvernoy believed this species to be closely related to the Asian water buffalo (Bubalus bubalis) and classified it as Bubalus antiquus. Several other fossils of S. antiquus were described under the names Bubalus bainii and Bubalus nilssoni.

In 1949, Dorothy Bate recognized that these buffaloes were conspecific and not related to Bubalus. She placed these fossils in a new genus, Homoioceras. However, the type species of Homoiceros was found to be synonymous with the Cape buffalo, invalidating the genus. It was subsequently moved to Pelorovis in 1978. However, a link with the living Cape buffalo has been noted based on morphological and systematic grounds, and since 1994 it has been suggested that P. antiquus be moved into Syncerus. This proposal has since gained widespread acceptance.

Etymology
The etymology of the generic epithet "pelorovis", chosen by Reck in 1928, is compounded from the Greek πέλωρος (péloros) in the sense of "monstrous" or "huge and terrible" and Latin ovis, meaning "sheep".

Description
 
Pelorovis resembled an African buffalo, although it was larger and possessed longer, curved horns. This ranks it as one of the largest bovines, and indeed one of the largest ruminants ever to have lived, rivalling the extinct American long-horned bison (Bison latifrons), and the extinct Asiatic giraffid Sivatherium giganteum, as well as the extant African giraffe (Giraffa camelopardalis) in weight. The horns pointed away from the head, each forming a half circle in the species Pelorovis oldowayensis and P. turkanensis.

P. oldowayensis was broadly the same size as modern African buffalo, but its legs were longer, and the elongated head of this species was reminiscent to those of the modern Alcelaphinae.

Distribution
P. oldowayensis occurred in sub-Saharan Africa and disappeared 800,000 years ago.

The best fossils of P. oldowayensis are known from the Olduvai Gorge in Tanzania.

See also

Rock art of south Oran (Algeria)
Saharan rock art

References

Prehistoric bovids
Pleistocene even-toed ungulates
Holocene extinctions
Extinct mammals of Africa
Pleistocene first appearances
Fossil taxa described in 1851
Pleistocene mammals of Africa
Prehistoric even-toed ungulate genera